Q64 may refer to:
 Q64 (New York City bus)
 At-Taghabun, a surah of the Quran